Gore Orphanage is a 2015 independent horror film and the directorial debut of Emily Lapisardi, who co-wrote the film with Cody Knotts. The film premiered at the Sandusky State Theater on July 11, 2015 and was released as a streaming video through Amazon on July 21. The film was inspired by the urban legend by the same name in Northern Ohio.

Filming took place in a classic revival mansion in Scottdale, Pennsylvania. Lapisardi and Knotts were inspired to create the film after researching the legend of the Gore Orphanage and wondering why it hadn't been adapted into a film. In February 2015 Gore Orphanage was named the most anticipated film of 2015 in the Horror Society Awards, which is judged based on reader votes.

Synopsis 
Nellie (Emma Smith) is a young orphan that has arrived at an orphanage run by Mrs. Pryor (Maria Olsen), a cruel woman who only sees the facility as a way to earn money. To make matters worse, the orphanage's maintenance man (Bill Townsend) appears to be even more depraved than she is. However, not all is bad, as Nellie is able to make a few friends, including Miss Lillian (Keri Maletto), who helps run the orphanage. However, as her stay lengthens, Nellie begins to realize that she may not leave the orphanage alive.

Cast
 	Maria Olsen as Mrs. Pryor
 	Bill Townsend as Ernst
 	Emma Smith a Nellie
 	Keri Maletto as Miss Lillian
 	Nora Hoyle as Esther
 	Brandon Mangin Jr. as Buddy
 	Rick Montgomery Jr. as Ted
 	Jeremy Kaluza as Harmon
 	Sharyn Kmieciak as Elderly Nellie
 	Nick LaMantia as Schoolboy Rowe
 	Ryan Nogy as Anna
 	William Sutherland IV as Ralph
 	Samantha Ziglear as Irene
 	Lakyn Campbell as Amber

Reception
Dread Central's review stated, "Flashes of brilliance from Lapisardi are observed with a few scenes where the kids were allowed to be kids when the evil Mrs. Pryor stepped away from the sightline, and how their happiness went swirling down the hopper when she returned – something so simply shot can result in a great scene of filmmaking, I don’t care how much (or how little) dough is dumped into the project. Alas, what could have been transformed into a straight-up mental twister of a thriller slides down that slippery crap-slope into useless violence in the hopes of reeling in the crowd, and that’s where I almost tuned out."

References

External links
 

2015 horror films
2015 directorial debut films
2015 films
American independent films
2015 independent films
2010s English-language films
2010s American films